Gerard Garner (born 2 November 1998) is an English professional footballer who plays as a forward for Barrow.

Early life
Garner attended Our Lady & St Swithin's Primary School in Croxteth.

Career
As an 11 year old Garner scored 76 goals in a season, breaking a record previously held by Wayne Rooney.

Beginning his career with Fleetwood Town, Garner spent loan spells at Southport in August 2017, Bamber Bridge in November 2017, and FC United of Manchester in March 2018.

On 25 October 2020, Garner joined National League North club Gateshead on a loan deal until December 2020. On 4 December 2020, the loan deal was extended until January 2021.

On 31 January 2023, Garner signed for League Two club Barrow for a club-record transfer fee on a two-and-a-half year deal.

Career statistics

References

1998 births
Living people
English footballers
Association football forwards
Fleetwood Town F.C. players
Southport F.C. players
Bamber Bridge F.C. players
F.C. United of Manchester players
Gateshead F.C. players
Barrow A.F.C. players
English Football League players
National League (English football) players
Northern Premier League players